Love In Singapore is a 2009 Indian Malayalam-language comedy drama film directed by Rafi Mecartin, starring Mammootty in lead role. Navneet Kaur made her Malayalam debut through this film.

Plot 
Machu, an orphan who became rich by selling scrap. The prime location for the film is in a large hall at a bottle recycling factory in Kochi. Machu starts off rather humbly but soon gets rich. Now his scrap business has branches all over India. Machu, who is uneducated, keeps a low profile and prefers to hang out with his two friends, Shukkoor and Narayanan. His life changes when Andrews Perreira, an Anglo Indian investor cheats Machu into investing all his wealth into Perreira's investment company. Perreira acts as if he tried to commit suicide to give his investment fraud a lively touch. The innocent investors, including Machu, believe this and forgive Perreira, believing it wasn't his fault. The movie takes a wild turn when Machu meets Perreira's daughter, Diana, and wishes to marry her.  But Perreira betrays Machu again by interchanging his daughter with his neighbour's daughter, an old friend of Machu's. On the wedding day, all falls apart as Machu and his friends goes to confront Perreira for his crimes, but Perreira with his daughter had already escaped to Singapore. Then the movie goes into utter humour as Machu and his sidekick tries to locate Perreira and Diana in Singapore.

Cast 

 Mammootty as Machu
 Navneet Kaur as Diana Pereira
 Suraj Venjaramoodu as Peethambaran
 Jayasurya as Tony
 Bijukuttan as Narayanan
 Salim Kumar as Shukkoor
 Lalu Alex as Police officer Rathnam
 Rajan P. Dev as Irumbu Mani
 Nedumudi Venu as Andrews Pereira
 Janardhanan
 Sukumari as Diana's Aunt
 John Kokken as Rahul
 Sruthi Lakshmi
 Geetha Vijayan

Production 
The film was produced by Rafi, under the banner M.H.M. Productions. Lyrics of Rajeev Alunkal and Santosh Varma have been set to music by Suresh Peters. The still photographer is Sunil Guruvayur. Navaneet Kaur was chosen as the female lead because the makers wanted a woman "who looks cosmopolitan". Shooting locations included Kochi, Karaikudi and Singapore.

Soundtrack

Reception 
Rediff wrote that "the script is illogical and consists of many 'laugh a minute' portions that have been put together to make this film. [...] Love in Singapore is one of the worst efforts by the director duo Rafi-Mecartin in recent times." Sify wrote, "In one word, avoidable."

References

External links 

 

2000s Malayalam-language films
2009 comedy-drama films
2009 films
Films shot in Singapore
Films shot in Karaikudi
Films shot in Kochi
Indian comedy-drama films
Films scored by Suresh Peters
Films directed by Rafi–Mecartin